Sturdy may refer to:

People
Fred Sturdy (1908–1972), American pole vaulter
Guy Sturdy (1899–1965), professional baseball player
John Henry Sturdy (1893–1966), Canadian educator and political figure
Jordan Sturdy, Canadian politician
Julian Sturdy (born 1971), British Conservative Party politician
Robert Sturdy (born 1944), British politician
Sturdy Maxwell (born c. 1898), Scottish footballer

Ships
, a list of United States ships

, a list of British Royal Navy ships

Other uses
Sturdy (infection), a parasitic infection that develops in the intermediate hosts of the tapeworm
A nickname for the 1950 Tacoma Narrows Bridge in the U.S. state of Washington